The Official Star Tribune Homer Hanky is a handkerchief-like rally towel printed for the Minnesota Twins. It was first introduced during the 1987 pennant race by the Minneapolis Star Tribune as a promotional item when the Twins won the American League Western division (AL West). Homer Hankies have been reprinted with different designs over the years to commemorate various occasions, including division titles, the inaugural opening day at Target Field, and the 2014 All Star Game. The Homer Hanky has been manufactured by several companies over the years, including Bensussen, Deutsch & Associates LLC and Winona, Minnesota based company, WinCraft Inc.

Years

1987

Star Tribune promotions manager Terrie Robbins thought up the idea of a Homer Hanky as a way to promote the newspaper during the Twins' 1987 playoff run. In a 2010 article, Tim McGuire, managing editor of the Star Tribune, contended that the beginnings of the Hanky were not without opposition from the Twins. He cites the organization's concerns from distracting players to being "the laughing stock of baseball". After handing out 60,000 Homer Hanky and a second inning Gary Gaetti home run in Game 1 of the ALCS, Terrie recalls, "I get teary-eyed and get goose bumps just telling you this, but when I looked, the stadium was awash with hankies cheering the Twins." In the coming weeks, a total of 2.3 million hankies were distributed.

The October 7, 1987 debut of the Homer Hanky was ranked #11 on the Top 100 Metrodome Moments

 Occasion: AL West Champions
Image: Red, baseball-shaped logo
 Slogan: "Championship Drive"
 Printed at the end of the season
 Twins won World Series (4–1 ALCS def Detroit Tigers, 4–3 WS, def St. Louis Cardinals)

1988
Before the start of the 1988 season, the Star Tribune and the Twins developed their own versions of a new white hanky, though there were talks about merging the ideas. Since the Star Tribune owned the Homer Hanky trademark, its version became the official Homer Hanky, while the Twins sold separate white hanky with the team's 1988 logo.

 Occasion: Celebration of 1987 World Series Championship and hopes of a repeat
 Image: Red, baseball diamond-shaped logo.
 Slogan: "Just As Great In '88"
 Printed at the beginning of the season
 Twins finished 2nd in AL West behind the Oakland Athletics

1991

 Occasion: AL West Champions
Image: Red, baseball-shaped logo.
 Slogan: "The Magic Is Back"
 Printed at the end of the season
 Twins won World Series (4-1 ALCS def Toronto Blue Jays, 4-3 WS, def Atlanta Braves)

2002
In 2002 there seems to be two sizes of the Homer Hanky "Proud and Loud". A larger and "normal" size of 15 inch square and a smaller size of 13 inches square with "hanky stitching" on the edge.

 Occasion: AL Central Champions
Image: Red, baseball-shaped logo.
 Slogan: "Proud and Loud"

2003

 Occasion: AL Central Champions
Image: Blue, baseball-shaped logo.
 Slogan: "Every Fan Counts"

2004

 Occasion: AL Central Champions
Image: Red, outline of a baseball field
 Printed at the end of the season

2006

 Occasion: AL Central Champions
Image: Red, State of Minnesota with Minnie and Paul Logo (similar to the Twins logo from 1961 to 1986)

2007
 Occasion: 20th Anniversary of the 1987 World Series victory
Image: 1987 World Series logo
Slogan: "20th Anniversary Homer Hanky"

2009
 Occasion: AL Central Championship (6-5 victory against the Detroit Tigers in Game 163)
 Image: Red Minnesota
Slogan: "This is Twins Territory"

2010
 Regular Season Hanky
Occasion: 2010 Home Opener at Target Field (Inaugural game of the inaugural season at Target Field)
Image: Official Target Field inaugural season logo  
Slogan: "The Official Opening Day Homer Hanky" with "April 12th, 2010 Twins vs. Red Sox" across the bottom.
 Postseason Hanky
 Occasion: AL Central Champions
Image: Minnie and Paul logo
 Slogan: "Championship Drive"

2014
 Occasion: All-Star Game on July 11, 2014.
Image: Solid red Minnesota
Slogan: "All Star Week 2014"

2019
The Star Tribune announced, in celebration of the Twins winning the AL Central regular season division championship in 2019, that a new Homer Hanky would be released.  They noted that the new hanky will not be white, as in previous years. This was the result of Major League Baseball adding a new rule forbidding white rally towels. It also took on a different fabric, changing to a thicker towel rather than a thin handkerchief. On April 19, 2020, in the midst of the COVID-19 pandemic, it was announced that the Twins would use leftover 2019 Homer Hankies to make CDC compliant face masks and donate them to health care and grocery workers. This was done in conjunction with Cub Foods, Love Your Melon, and Faribault Woolen Mill Co.

 Occasion: AL Central Champions
Image: White baseball outline on red towel
 Slogan: "Welcome to BOMBA SZN"

2020
The 2020 Homer Hanky retained the thicker towel fabric from 2019, but it did return to the traditional white color. Since fans were not allowed in the stadium during the playoffs, there would be no violation of MLB's white towel rule.

Occasion: AL Central Champions
Image: White outline of Minnesota with a red house at the bottom
Slogan: 2020 Homer Hanky

See also
 Handy horn
 Rally towel
 Terrible Towel
 Vuvuzela

References

Minnesota Twins
Sports paraphernalia
1987 introductions